Bobby Charles Johnson (born September 1, 1960) is a former American football defensive back who played for the New Orleans Saints and St. Louis Cardinals of the National Football League (NFL). He played college football at University of Texas at Austin.

References 

1960 births
Living people
People from La Grange, Texas
Players of American football from Texas
American football defensive backs
Texas Longhorns football players
New Orleans Saints players
St. Louis Cardinals (football) players